The 2017 Big Ten Conference baseball tournament was held at Bart Kaufman Field on the campus of Indiana University in Bloomington, Indiana from May 24 through 28. The  Iowa Hawkeyes claimed the Big Ten Conference's automatic bid to the 2017 NCAA Division I baseball tournament. The event aired on the Big Ten Network. The event was held in Bloomington for one year before returning to Omaha, Nebraska, site of the College World Series.

Format and seeding
The 2017 tournament was an 8 team double-elimination tournament. The top eight teams based on conference regular season winning percentage earned invites to the tournament. The teams then played a double-elimination tournament leading to a single championship game.

Tournament

References

Tournament
Big Ten Baseball Tournament
Big Ten baseball tournament
Big Ten baseball tournament